Strand Fiord Pass is a mountain pass on southern Axel Heiberg Island, Nunavut, Canada.

References 

Arctic Cordillera
Mountain passes of Qikiqtaaluk Region